Seven Days Live is the fourth video/DVD album from the American heavy metal/glam metal Poison, featuring a live concert at the Hammersmith Odeon, in London England, from the Native Tongue world tour in 1993, in support of the fourth Poison studio album Native Tongue, which was certified Gold by the RIAA on April 21, 1993.

The song "7 Days Over You" was released as a promo single to promote the video release.

It was originally released on VHS in 1993 and then on DVD in 2006. It was also released as Poison Live In Concert with a different cover in 2003.

Track listing

 The Scream
 Strike Up The Band
 Ride the Wind
 Good Love
 Body Talk
 Something to Believe In
 Stand
 Fallen Angel
 Look What The Cat Dragged In
 Until You Suffer Some (Fire and Ice)
 7 Days Over You
 Unskinny Bop
 Talk Dirty To Me
 Every Rose Has Its Thorn
 Nothin' but a Good Time

Seven Days Live CD

In 2008, an audio CD of Poison Seven Days Live was released (August 26, 2008) from the same 1993 concert. The track listing is the same as the DVD with the exception of an additional track, "Your Mama Don't Dance".

 The Scream
 Strike Up The Band
Ride the Wind
 Good Love
 Your Mama Don't Dance
 Body Talk
 Something to Believe In
 Stand
 Fallen Angel
 Look What The Cat Dragged In
 Drum Solo
 Until You Suffer Some (Fire and Ice)
 7 Days Over You
 Unskinny Bop
 Talk Dirty To Me
 Every Rose Has Its Thorn
 Nothin' but a Good Time

Band members
 Bret Michaels - Lead vocals, rhythm guitar, harmonica, percussion
 Richie Kotzen - Lead Guitar, mandolin, backing vocals
 Bobby Dall - Bass, acoustic guitar, piano, backing vocals
 Rikki Rockett - Drums, percussion, backing vocals

Additional musician
 Jesse Bradman - Keyboards, piano, backing vocals

References

External links
Official website

1993 video albums
Live video albums
Poison (American band) live albums
Poison (American band) video albums
1993 live albums